Panchaia may refer to:

 Panchaia (island), an island mentioned by the philosopher Euhemerus.
 The Panchaia Rupes, a feature on Mars named for the mythical island.